Jimmy Elliot (1838, Athlone, Ireland – March 1, 1883) was an Irish-American boxer who was Heavyweight Champion of the World from 1865 to 1868. On December 12, 1870 Elliott was arrested and convicted of highway robbery and assault with intent to kill. He was sentenced to sixteen years and ten months at the Eastern State Penitentiary in Philadelphia. He was released early in the spring of 1879 due to an eye disease. On March 1, 1883, a gambler by the name of Jere Dunn shot Elliot in a Chicago saloon. He died shortly after.

External links
Elliot's semi Record at Cyber Boxing Zone

1838 births
1883 deaths
Irish emigrants to the United States (before 1923)
Bare-knuckle boxers
American people convicted of assault
Deaths by firearm in Illinois
People murdered in Illinois
Male murder victims
Irish people imprisoned abroad
Prisoners and detainees of Pennsylvania
Irish people murdered abroad
Irish male boxers
Heavyweight boxers
1883 murders in the United States
People from Athlone